Hyun Woo-Sung (born March 16, 1979) is a South Korean actor.

Filmography

Television series

References

External links
 Hyun Woo-sung Fan Cafe at Daum 
 
 Hyun Woo-sung Official Fan Club of Japan  

South Korean male actors
Living people
1979 births
South Korean male television actors
Seoul National University of Science and Technology alumni